Robert Dunne (5 September 1830 – 13 January 1917) was the second Roman Catholic bishop of Brisbane and later he became its first archbishop.

Dunne was born in Ardfinnan, County Tipperary, Ireland and was educated at Lismore Grammar School and the Irish College at Rome. After a brilliant collegiate course, Dunne was ordained priest in 1855, then appointed a master at St Laurence O'Toole Seminary, Dublin, of which the Rev. James Quinn was president. When Quinn was made the first bishop of Brisbane he brought Dunne with him. They arrived at Brisbane in May 1861 and Dunne began to carry out the work of diocesan secretary in addition to his duties as a parish priest. Dunne soon became a prominent figure in the young city, and there was much regret when he was removed to Toowoomba in 1868. On Quinn's death, Dunne became the second Roman Catholic bishop of Brisbane, and was consecrated on 18 June 1882. On 10 May 1887 Dunne was appointed the first Roman Catholic archbishop of Brisbane, holding the office for nearly 30 years. In 1890 Dunne visited Rome and during his absence the opportunity was taken of building a new episcopal residence for him.

Dunne did not take a prominent part in public affairs, but his church work was unrelenting. And though he was glad to see new churches springing up everywhere, and was especially interested in the spread of new schools, he insisted strongly that the real foundation of the church was religion in the home. Dunne's health began to fail in 1910 and in 1912 James Duhig became coadjutor archbishop. Dunne died in Brisbane on 13 January 1917.

References

1830 births
1917 deaths
People from County Tipperary
Roman Catholic archbishops of Brisbane
Australian people of Irish descent
Irish expatriate Roman Catholic archbishops
Roman Catholic bishops of Brisbane